Interstate 235 is the designation for three Interstate Highways in the United States, all of which are related to Interstate 35:
Interstate 235 (Iowa), an east–west route through downtown Des Moines.
Interstate 235 (Kansas), a bypass route of Interstate 135 that travels around the western part of Wichita.
Legal name for Interstate 35W (Texas)

35-2
2